Graham Betchart (born April 30, 1978) is a sports psychology mental skills coach and current director of mental training for Lucid Performance. He is known for the concept "Play Present," which teaches that an athlete needs to stay focused on the task at hand and immediately move on to the next play despite results or outcomes. He is also noted for the "MVP" program (Mediate, Visualize, Positive affirmation), a sports psychology mental training tool, as well as "WIN" (What is Important Now), which asserts that a player can only control attitude, effort, and focus. Notable athletes Betchart has coached include Andrew Wiggins, Karl-Anthony Towns, and Ben Simmons, the first overall picks for the 2014, 2015, and 2016 NBA drafts, respectively.

References

Further reading
 
 
 

1978 births
Living people
Sports psychologists
American sports coaches